The Case Mansion in Canton, Ohio, was a historic work of architect Guy Tilden. It was listed on the National Register of Historic Places, but removed from the National Register in 1990 after being demolished.

References

Houses on the National Register of Historic Places in Ohio
Romanesque Revival architecture in Ohio
Houses completed in 1902
Houses in Stark County, Ohio
National Register of Historic Places in Stark County, Ohio
Buildings and structures in Canton, Ohio
Former National Register of Historic Places in Ohio